is a Japanese football player for YSCC Yokohama.

Career
After attending Meikai University, Yanagi signed for YSCC Yokohama in December 2017. He then debuted in J3 League in a game against Gainare Tottori, coming in at the 92nd minute.

Club statistics
Updated to 23 August 2018.

References

External links

Profile at J. League
Profile at YSCC Yokohama

1995 births
Living people
Meikai University alumni
Association football people from Niigata Prefecture
Japanese footballers
J3 League players
YSCC Yokohama players
Association football defenders